St. Casimir Parish may refer to several Roman Catholic parishes:

St. Casimir Parish, Terryville, Connecticut
St. Casimir Parish, South Bend, Indiana
St. Casimir Parish Historic District
St. Casimir Parish, Maynard, Massachusetts
St. Casimir Parish, New Bedford, Massachusetts, a Polish-American Roman Catholic parish in New England
St. Casimir Parish, Warren, Rhode Island